Kjetil André Aamodt (born 2 September 1971) is a former World Cup alpine ski racer from Norway, a champion in the Olympics, World Championships, and World Cup. He is one of the most successful alpine ski racers from Norway.

Biography
Born in Oslo, Aamodt is the only alpine skier to win 8 Olympic medals, and has won 5 World Championship gold medals as well as 21 individual World Cup events. Described as an all-round alpine skier, Aamodt participated in all alpine skiing disciplines in the World Cup and World Championships, and is one of only five male alpine skiers to have won a World Cup race in all five disciplines.

Aamodt's combined career total of twenty World Championship and Olympic medals is an all-time best. He is the second-youngest male alpine skier to win an Olympic gold medal (age 20 in 1992; Toni Sailer was two months younger in 1956). Until 2014, he was also the oldest alpine skier to win an Olympic gold medal. For almost six years, Aamodt led the all-time Marathon World Cup ranking, with a total of 13,252 points earned from 1989 to 2006 – until 14 March 2012, when Austrian Benjamin Raich overtook him with a fifth place in the downhill at the 2012 World Cup final in Schladming to total 13,281 points, earned from 1998.
Another all-time best is his 231 World Cup top-ten results, 9 ahead of Benjamin Raich.

By winning the super-G race at the 2006 Olympics, Aamodt became the first male alpine skier to win four gold medals in the Olympics. (Toni Sailer and Jean-Claude Killy both swept the three alpine events at a single Olympics, and Alberto Tomba won three gold medals over two Olympics.)

Aamodt had 19 Olympic and World Championship medals stolen from him. The medals were taken in August 2003 by burglars who broke into a safe in his father's home. The five-time world champion and winner of four Olympic gold medals later revealed they were recovered by an anonymous helper over the internet.

Aamodt announced the conclusion of his career on live television on 6 January 2007, with hundreds of fellow athletes in attendance, at the Norwegian Sports Gala (Idrettsgallaen) where he had been selected as awardee of the year for 2006.

Aamodt now runs a ski race camp in Gaustablikk, Norway, and does public speaking.

Legacy
In February 2015 Aamodt (and Lasse Kjus) were selected as recipients of the Legends of Honor by the Vail Valley Foundation, and inducted into the International Ski Racing Hall of Fame.

World Cup results

Season standings

Season titles 
1 overall, 1 super-G, 1 giant slalom, 1 slalom

^official season title in the combined disciplinewas not awarded until the 2007 season

Race victories 
21 wins (1 downhill, 5 super-G, 6 giant slalom, 1 slalom, 8 combined)
64 podiums, 231 top tens (first skier of all-time in this ranking).

World Championships results

Olympic results

See also
List of multiple Olympic gold medalists

References

External links
 
 
  

1971 births
Norwegian male alpine skiers
Alpine skiers at the 1992 Winter Olympics
Alpine skiers at the 1994 Winter Olympics
Alpine skiers at the 1998 Winter Olympics
Alpine skiers at the 2002 Winter Olympics
Alpine skiers at the 2006 Winter Olympics
Olympic alpine skiers of Norway
Medalists at the 1992 Winter Olympics
Medalists at the 1994 Winter Olympics
Medalists at the 2002 Winter Olympics
Medalists at the 2006 Winter Olympics
Olympic medalists in alpine skiing
Olympic gold medalists for Norway
Olympic silver medalists for Norway
Olympic bronze medalists for Norway
FIS Alpine Ski World Cup champions
Alpine skiers from Oslo
Living people